Civil Alliance Party is a secular political party in Jordan founded in late 2018.

References

External links
 Official website
 Facebook page

Political parties in Jordan
Political parties established in 2018
2018 establishments in Jordan